Fazlur Rahmān Usmānī (1831 – 15 June 1907) was an Indian Muslim scholar and poet who co-founded the Darul Uloom Deoband. He was father of the scholars, Aziz-ur-Rahman Usmani and Shabbir Ahmad Usmani. His grandson Atiqur Rahman Usmani was the founder of Nadwatul Musannifeen.

Biography
Usmānī was born in 1831 in Deoband. He was an alumnus of Delhi College where he had studied under Mamluk Ali Nanautawi. He was a Deputy Inspector of Schools in the Education Department. He co-founded Darul Uloom Deoband along with Muhammad Qasim Nanautawi, Sayyid Muhammad Abid and others. He remained a member of the executive council of Darul Uloom Deoband throughout his life.

Usmānī died on 15 June 1907. His most elder son was Aziz-ur-Rahman Usmani, who served as the first Grand Mufti of Darul Uloom Deoband. His another son, Shabbir Ahmad Usmani was among the founding figures of Pakistan. His grandson Atiqur Rahman Usmani co-founded Nadwatul Musannifeen and the All India Muslim Majlis-e-Mushawarat.

Literary works
Usmānī's Persian poem Qissa-e Gham-e Diban is considered as a historical document related to Deoband.

References

Bibliography
 

1907 deaths
Academic staff of Darul Uloom Deoband
Usmani family
Indian Sunni Muslim scholars of Islam
19th-century Indian Muslims
20th-century Indian Muslims
Urdu-language poets from India
People from Deoband
Deobandis